Shahmar Beyglu (also Romanized as Shahmār Beyglū) is a village in Pain Barzand Rural District, Anguti District, Germi County, Ardabil Province, Iran. At the 2006 census, its population was 236, in 47 families.

References 

Towns and villages in Germi County